Siberia is the second studio album by Canadian recording artist Lights. It was released worldwide on October 4, 2011, excluding Australia (October 28, 2011) and the United Kingdom (March 12, 2012). Production was handled by Tawgs Salter and Canadian electronic band Holy Fuck, while featuring guest vocals from Canadian rapper Shad on two of the album's tracks. Musically, Siberia has been described as being "grittier" and "darker" whilst also incorporating "poppier moments", and while the album still uses prominent elements of synthpop, it also features influences of other genres such as dubstep and hip-hop and bitpop.

The album has received generally positive reviews from music critics, with some commending Lights' vocal performance as well as the album's heavier and more mature sound, while others criticized its lack of variety. It debuted at number three on the Canadian Albums Chart, selling more than 10,000 in its first week, while also peaking at number 47 on the US Billboard 200 in the United States. It received a Juno Award nomination for Pop Album of the Year on February 7, 2012. It was certified gold on April 27, 2012 in Canada, denoting sales in excess of 40,000. The album spawned the singles "Everybody Breaks a Glass", "Toes", and "Where the Fence Is Low".

Background
Siberia follows Lights' debut studio album The Listening (2009), and her second extended play Acoustic (2010). After Acoustic Lights, a Tononto-based synth-pop artist, spent time searching for inspiration for her next album. Lights describes a night out in Montreal turning her on to dubstep, which she described as "heavy and raunchy but with this melody in there". At the suggestion of her manager, Jian Ghomeshi, Lights decided to collaborate with the Toronto-based electronica band Holy Fuck, who she had met previously at the Reading and Leeds Festivals. She stated she was drawn to their style of creating lo-fi electro sound using analog equipment, something she described as "a new way of thinking", and related with the band's focus on experimentation. Lights credited Crystal Castles, Bon Iver, Skream and Benga as musical influences for the album, as well as a book by artist Clyde Caldwell. The final track in the album, Day One, was a live recording of the last nine minutes of Lights' first jam session with Holy Fuck. Listening to it back the next day, they decided to keep the recording and turn it into its own track.

Critical reception

Siberia received generally positive reviews from music critics, with some commending Lights' vocal performance as well as the album's heavier and more mature sound, while others criticized its lack of originality. Matt Collar from AllMusic gave it a positive review, saying "The album is a blissful, laser-toned experience where Poxleitner's sweet voice is expertly wrapped in stylish, multicolored hues of fluorescent keyboard squelch and bass guitar shimmer." Drew Beringer from AbsolutePunk also gave it a positive review, calling it "one of the better electro-pop albums of 2011, one that will stimulate your senses and rope you in with its instantaneous catchiness", but stated that Lights' vocal performance was "too safe". Alternative Press gave the album a mixed review, saying "The bulk of the album's 14 tracks find her playing it safe with a helium-voiced squeak reminiscent of (take your pick) Gwen Stefani, Santigold, Kate Bush or Cyndi Lauper." Kosta Lucas from DIY Magazine wrote the album failed to shine by blending into what is already out there, adding that it is "a good snapshot of what is currently en vogue in modern music", though he praised the songs which showcased more of Lights' voice, stating that "she sings very prettily". James Murray of musicOMH wrote that the combination of having a "light-hearted pop musician" team up with "one of the most experimental, noisy electronic producers currently active" was a juxtaposition that resulted in "a unique, and for the most part, captivating listen", but also criticised the vocal performance, which Murray stated was often "overshadowed by wobbly bass and distorted synths".

Commercial performance
In Canada, Siberia debuted at number three on the Canadian Albums Chart, selling more than 10,000 in its first week. On April 27, 2012, the album was certified gold by Music Canada for denoting sales in excess of 40,000 copies in Canada.

Track listing

Personnel

Lights – bass, guitar, synthesizer, vocals, producer
Brian Borcherdt – producer
Daenen Bramberger – engineer
Joän Carvalho – mastering
Wayne Cochrane – assistant engineer
Caitlin Cronenberg – photography
Lenny DeRose – engineer
Holy Fuck – drum producer, engineer, synthesizer
Shad K – vocals
Maurie Kauffman – drums
Terrance Lam – assistance engineer
Graham Marsh – producer
Dave Mohasci – engineer
Jay Parsons – composer, drum programming
Thomas Salter – bass, engineer, guitar, synthesizer, producer
Dave Thompson – programming, producer
Graham Walsh – producer

Charts

Weekly charts

Certifications

Release history

References

2011 albums
Lights (musician) albums
Universal Music Canada albums
Warner Records albums
Albums recorded at Metalworks Studios
Last Gang Records albums